The 1985 Virginia Slims of Newport was a women's tennis tournament played on outdoor grass courts at the International Tennis Hall of Fame in Newport, Rhode Island in the United States that was part of the 1985 Virginia Slims World Championship Series.It was the seventh edition of the tournament and was held from July 15 through July 21, 1985. First-seeded Chris Evert-Lloyd won the singles title, her second at the event after 1974.

Finals

Singles
 Chris Evert-Lloyd defeated  Pam Shriver 6–4, 6–1
 It was Evert-Lloyd's 6th singles title of the year and the 138th of her career.

Doubles
 Chris Evert-Lloyd /  Wendy Turnbull defeated  Pam Shriver /  Elizabeth Smylie 6–4, 7–6

See also
 1985 Hall of Fame Tennis Championships

References

External links
 ITF tournament edition details

Virginia Slims of Newport
Virginia Slims of Newport
1985 in sports in Rhode Island